Malaysian people of European descent are a less than .1% of the population, but the British Empire had ruled Malay peninsula for over a hundred years.

Notable people
 David Rowley
 Diana Danielle
 Farish A. Noor
 Hishammuddin Hussein
 Julia Rais
 Julia Ziegler
 Matthew Davies
 Hussein Onn
 Quentin Cheng
 Stuart Wark
 Stuart Wilkin 
 Sarkies Brothers

References